The Survivors is Volume X of the novel sequence Alms for Oblivion by Simon Raven, published in 1976. It was the tenth and last novel to be published in The Alms for Oblivion sequence and is also the tenth novel chronologically. The story takes place in Venice in 1973.

Plot summary

The story takes place in Venice during the autumn of 1973. Detterling, Fielding Gray and Mr. and Mrs. Stern take part in a meeting of the International PEN Club. Tom Llewyllyn and his daughter "Baby" are also attending. Right after the conference the company are told of the death of Lord Canteloupe, Minister of Commerce. Since the lord has lost his son (as told in Sound The Retreat) and his male siblings are dead, Captain Detterling will inherit the title being the closest male relative. Peter Morrison succeeds Canteloupe as minister of Commerce.

Tom Llewyllyn mentions that he is waiting for Daniel Mond but does not reveal that Mond is dying and wants to spend his last days in Venice. The company also meets Max de Freville and Stratis "Lyki" Lykiadopolous, who are about to open a casino in the city. With them is a young Sicilian by the name of Piero. Max and Lyki live in Palazzo Albani which they are renting from the absentee owners. Detterling arranges so Tom and Daniel can live in the tower of the palazzo. During a dinner the company discusses the family portraits of the house, including one of an unknown young man. Captain Detterling brings Baby back to England and they become friends. Together with her aunt Isobel, Detterling helps Baby into a school more to her taste. Isobel and Gregory tell Detterling the story of how Baby's mother Patricia ended up in a mental hospital.

Piero, who has become friends with Daniel, makes small trips with him, at one time to a monastery on the island called San Francisco del Deserto. While there, Daniel recognises one of the Franciscan friars as former undergraduate Hugh Balliston (from Places Where They Sing). Balliston deeply regrets his actions of 1967 and has become a monk. Meanwhile, Lyki and Max have troubles with rich Arabs who play with high stakes in their casino, which means the partners must have much money at hand. Piero finds an old manuscript from the late 18th century, with part of the story about the Albani family. Fielding Gray discovers that the young man on the painting is a certain Englishman by the name of Humbert FitzAvon. After having found another manuscript Fielding realises that FitzAvon, who in 1797 was hanged by a mob of peasants, was son of the first Lord Canteloupe. He had corrupted the Albani family and married a peasant girl he had made pregnant before being lynched. Gray understands that if male descendants of FitzAvon and the girl still live, one of them is really the rightful Lord Canteloupe. With Tom and Piero Fielding heads off to the place where FitzAvon is buried and meets Jude Holbrook, who lives in the area with his mother. With the help of Holbrook the company finds a living male descendant, an imbecile little boy by the name of Paolo Filavoni. No-one wants to reveal the secret since this would mean trouble to Detterling but Piero eventually tells Lyki. Fielding uses the story in a novel but changes the facts radically.

Daniel, who has been investigating a tool that has been used in the casino, dies. Piero talks to Hugh who agrees to their burying Daniel on his island. A magnificent funeral procession by boat for Daniel ends the story. The major characters are all participating, except for Fielding Gray and Leonard Percival, who watch the procession from a bridge. Many people from the life of Daniel (and the novel sequence in general) attend too: Robert Constable, Jacquiz Helmut, Balbo Blakeney, soldiers Chead and Bunce, journalist Alfie Schroeder and even Mond's old nemesis, Earl Restarick. During the procession Lyki tries to blackmail Detterling about his title since he needs money. Detterling reveals that Daniel had found out that the instrument he was studying is used for cheating in the casino. Detterling promises to keep quiet about this if Lyki does the same. The funeral ends and the participants strike up small conversations in their boats on the way back. Only Piero, who is about to become a friar himself, notices a black stain spreading across the water of the lagoon.

1976 British novels
Novels by Simon Raven
Fiction set in 1973
Novels set in Venice
Blond & Briggs books